In statistics and machine learning, the bias–variance tradeoff is the property of a model that the variance of the parameter estimated across samples can be reduced by increasing the bias in the estimated parameters.
The bias–variance dilemma or bias–variance problem is the conflict in trying to simultaneously minimize these two sources of error that prevent supervised learning algorithms from generalizing beyond their training set:
 The bias error is an error from erroneous assumptions in the learning algorithm. High bias can cause an algorithm to miss the relevant relations between features and target outputs (underfitting).
 The variance is an error from sensitivity to small fluctuations in the training set. High variance may result from an algorithm modeling the random noise in the training data (overfitting).

The bias–variance decomposition is a way of analyzing a learning algorithm's expected generalization error with respect to a particular problem as a sum of three terms, the bias, variance, and a quantity called the irreducible error, resulting from noise in the problem itself.

Motivation

The bias–variance tradeoff is a central problem in supervised learning. Ideally, one wants to choose a model that both accurately captures the regularities in its training data, but also generalizes well to unseen data. Unfortunately, it is typically impossible to do both simultaneously. High-variance learning methods may be able to represent their training set well but are at risk of overfitting to noisy or unrepresentative training data. In contrast, algorithms with high bias typically produce simpler models that may fail to capture important regularities (i.e. underfit) in the data.

It is an often made fallacy to assume that complex models must have high variance; High variance models are 'complex' in some sense, but the reverse needs not be true.
In addition, one has to be careful how to define complexity: In particular, the number of parameters used to describe the model is a poor measure of complexity. This is illustrated by an example adapted from: The model  has only two parameters but it can interpolate any number of points by oscillating with a high enough frequency, resulting in both a high bias and high variance.

An analogy can be made to the relationship between accuracy and precision. Accuracy is a description of bias and can intuitively be improved by selecting from only local information. Consequently, a sample will appear accurate (i.e. have low bias) under the aforementioned selection conditions, but may result in underfitting. In other words, test data may not agree as closely with training data, which would indicate imprecision and therefore inflated variance. A graphical example would be a straight line fit to data exhibiting quadratic behavior overall. Precision is a description of variance and generally can only be improved by selecting information from a comparatively larger space. The option to select many data points over a broad sample space is the ideal condition for any analysis. However, intrinsic constraints (whether physical, theoretical, computational, etc.) will always play a limiting role. The limiting case where only a finite number of data points are selected over a broad sample space may result in improved precision and lower variance overall, but may also result in an overreliance on the training data (overfitting). This means that test data would also not agree as closely with the training data, but in this case the reason is due to inaccuracy or high bias. To borrow from the previous example, the graphical representation would appear as a high-order polynomial fit to the same data exhibiting quadratic behavior. Note that error in each case is measured the same way, but the reason ascribed to the error is different depending on the balance between bias and variance. To mitigate how much information is used from neighboring observations, a model can be smoothed via explicit regularization, such as shrinkage.

Bias–variance decomposition of mean squared error

Suppose that we have a training set consisting of a set of points  and real values  associated with each point .

We want to find a function , that approximates the true function  as well as possible, by means of some learning algorithm based on a training dataset (sample) . Of course, we cannot hope to do so perfectly, since the  contain noise ; this means we must be prepared to accept an irreducible error in any function we come up with.

Finding an  that generalizes to points outside of the training set can be done with any of the countless algorithms used for supervised learning. It turns out that whichever function  we select, we can decompose its expected error on an unseen sample  as follows:

where

and

The expectation ranges over different choices of the training set , all sampled from the same joint distribution  which can for example be done via bootstrapping.
The three terms represent:
 the square of the bias of the learning method, which can be thought of as the error caused by the simplifying assumptions built into the method. E.g., when approximating a non-linear function  using a learning method for linear models, there will be error in the estimates  due to this assumption;
 the variance of the learning method, or, intuitively, how much the learning method  will move around its mean;
 the irreducible error .

Since all three terms are non-negative, the irreducible error forms a lower bound on the expected error on unseen samples.

The more complex the model  is, the more data points it will capture, and the lower the bias will be. However, complexity will make the model "move" more to capture the data points, and hence its variance will be larger.

Derivation
The derivation of the bias–variance decomposition for squared error proceeds as follows. For notational convenience, we abbreviate ,  and we drop the  subscript on our expectation operators.

Let us write the mean-squared error of our model:

First,

Secondly, since we model , we show that

Lastly,

Finally, MSE loss function (or negative log-likelihood) is obtained by taking the expectation value over :

Approaches
Dimensionality reduction and feature selection can decrease variance by simplifying models. Similarly, a larger training set tends to decrease variance. Adding features (predictors) tends to decrease bias, at the expense of introducing additional variance. Learning algorithms typically have some tunable parameters that control bias and variance; for example,
 linear  and Generalized linear models can be regularized to decrease their variance at the cost of increasing their bias.
 In artificial neural networks, the variance increases and the bias decreases as the number of hidden units increase, although this classical assumption has been the subject of recent debate. Like in GLMs, regularization is typically applied.
 In k-nearest neighbor models, a high value of  leads to high bias and low variance (see below).
 In instance-based learning, regularization can be achieved varying the mixture of prototypes and exemplars.
 In decision trees, the depth of the tree determines the variance. Decision trees are commonly pruned to control variance.

One way of resolving the trade-off is to use mixture models and ensemble learning. For example, boosting combines many "weak" (high bias) models in an ensemble that has lower bias than the individual models, while bagging combines "strong" learners in a way that reduces their variance.

Model validation methods such as cross-validation (statistics) can be used to tune models so as to optimize the trade-off.

k-nearest neighbors
In the case of -nearest neighbors regression, when the expectation is taken over the possible labeling of a fixed training set, a closed-form expression exists that relates the bias–variance decomposition to the parameter :

In fact, under "reasonable assumptions" the bias of the first-nearest neighbor (1-NN) estimator vanishes entirely as the size of the training set approaches infinity.

Applications

In regression
The bias–variance decomposition forms the conceptual basis for regression regularization methods such as Lasso and ridge regression. Regularization methods introduce bias into the regression solution that can reduce variance considerably relative to the ordinary least squares (OLS) solution.  Although the OLS solution provides non-biased regression estimates, the lower variance solutions produced by regularization techniques provide superior MSE performance.

In classification
The bias–variance decomposition was originally formulated for least-squares regression. For the case of classification under the 0-1 loss (misclassification rate), it is possible to find a similar decomposition. Alternatively, if the classification problem can be phrased as probabilistic classification, then the expected squared error of the predicted probabilities with respect to the true probabilities can be decomposed as before.

It has been argued that as training data increases, the variance of learned models will tend to decrease, and hence that as training data quantity increases, error is minimized by methods that learn models with lesser bias, and that conversely, for smaller training data quantities it is ever more important to minimize variance.

In reinforcement learning
Even though the bias–variance decomposition does not directly apply in reinforcement learning, a similar tradeoff can also characterize generalization. When an agent has limited information on its environment, the suboptimality of an RL algorithm can be decomposed into the sum of two terms: a term related to an asymptotic bias and a term due to overfitting. The asymptotic bias is directly related to the learning algorithm (independently of the quantity of data) while the overfitting term comes from the fact that the amount of data is limited.

In human learning
While widely discussed in the context of machine learning, the bias–variance dilemma has been examined in the context of human cognition, most notably by Gerd Gigerenzer and co-workers in the context of learned heuristics. They have argued (see references below) that the human brain resolves the dilemma in the case of the typically sparse, poorly-characterised training-sets provided by experience by adopting high-bias/low variance heuristics. This reflects the fact that a zero-bias approach has poor generalisability to new situations, and also unreasonably presumes precise knowledge of the true state of the world. The resulting heuristics are relatively simple, but produce better inferences in a wider variety of situations.

Geman et al. argue that the bias–variance dilemma implies that abilities such as generic object recognition cannot be learned from scratch, but require a certain degree of "hard wiring"   that is later tuned by experience.  This is because model-free approaches to inference require impractically large training sets if they are to avoid high variance.

See also

 Accuracy and precision
 Bias of an estimator
 Double descent
 Gauss–Markov theorem
 Hyperparameter optimization
 Law of total variance
 Minimum-variance unbiased estimator
 Model selection
 Regression model validation
 Supervised learning

References

External links 
 MLU-Explain: The Bias Variance Tradeoff — An interactive visualization of the bias-variance tradeoff in LOESS Regression and K-Nearest Neighbors.

Dilemmas
Model selection
Machine learning
Statistical classification